Jae'Sean Tate (born October 28, 1995) is an American professional basketball player for the Houston Rockets of the National Basketball Association (NBA). He played college basketball for the Ohio State Buckeyes in the Big Ten Conference. Tate is represented by Beyond Athlete Management.

Early life and high school career
Tate is the oldest son of Jermaine Tate, who played basketball at Ohio State in 1996–97 before transferring to Cincinnati and playing professionally overseas. His mother, Cori Key, was stabbed to death by her boyfriend Damiene Boles on July 31, 2004. Boles was convicted of the murder three years later. After his mother's death, Tate was raised by his father and stepmom Jenice alongside their three children. Tate went through anger management to process his emotions and has a tattoo of a key on his leg.

Tate attended Pickerington High School Central, where he excelled at basketball and football. He played defensive end and tight end before a shoulder injury cut his junior season short, and he focused on basketball from then on. On the hardwood, Tate was a teammate of Caris LeVert and made the game-winning tip-in in a playoff win over Columbus Marion-Franklin as a freshman. As a sophomore, his team went 26–2 and won the 2012 Division I championship defeating Toledo Whitmer in the final game. In both his junior and senior years, Tate went on to be a first-team all-conference player. He injured his shoulder as a junior, shortening his season, but still averaged 22.3 points, 12 rebounds, and three assists per game. Tate ended his high school career as the number 1 ranked player in Ohio and the 15th ranked forward in the nation in the ESPN top 100.

College career

As a freshman, Tate posted 8.8 points and 5 rebounds per game. His averages climbed to 12.1 points and 5.5 rebounds per game since becoming a full-time starter against Northwestern on January 22, 2015. Tate was a Big Ten All-Freshman Team selection. Despite standing 6'4", Tate sometimes played center on a Buckeyes team that featured 6'5" point guard D'Angelo Russell. Tate averaged 11.7 points, 6.4 rebounds, and 1.5 assists per game as a sophomore. He missed the final seven games with a shoulder injury. He was a Big Ten Honorable Mention selection.

Tate was an Honorable Mention All-Big Ten selection as a junior. As a junior, Tate led the Buckeyes in scoring with 14.3 points per game, taking the primary role on offense due to an injury to Keita Bates-Diop. Toward the end of his junior season, Tate contemplated giving up basketball and walking on to Ohio State's football team. He described a locker room situation in which players had completely given up on the team and did not even want to play in the NIT. A conversation with coach Thad Matta and assistant coach Greg Paulus persuaded Tate to return to the floor for his senior year. He had second thoughts after Matta was fired in favor of Chris Holtmann, but Holtmann and Tate developed a strong relationship.

As a senior, Tate was a captain alongside a healthy Bates-Diop, and had some impressive moments including setting an Ohio State record going 10-for-10 from the field in a win over Northeastern in November 2017. Tate scored 14 points going 6-for-11 from the field in a comeback victory over Michigan in December. He averaged 12.3 points and 6.2 rebounds per game as a senior on an NCAA Tournament squad that finished 25-9. He was named to the Second Team All-Big Ten by the coaches and honorable mention all-conference by the media. Tate finished as Ohio State’s 19th-leading scorer with 1,512 points. After the season, he worked with coach Joey Burton to improve his shooting technique in preparation for a professional career.

Professional career

Antwerp Giants (2018–2019) 
After going undrafted in the 2018 NBA draft, Tate joined the Milwaukee Bucks for the 2018 NBA Summer League. However, he was unable to play for the Bucks due to a fractured finger on his right hand. On August 20, 2018, he signed in Belgium with the Antwerp Giants. While with the Antwerp Giants, Tate was a Belgian League all-star and helped lead the Giants to their first Belgian Cup title in 12 years. In 42 league games, he averaged 10.2 points, 3.9 rebounds, and 1.7 assists per game. He also averaged 13.0 points, 5.6 rebounds, and 1.6 assists in 24 BCL games.

Sydney Kings (2019–2020) 
On July 22, 2019, Tate signed with the Sydney Kings of the Australian National Basketball League (NBL) for the 2019–20 NBL season. He averaged 16.4 points, 2 assists, and 5.8 rebounds per game and was named to the All-NBL First Team.

Houston Rockets (2020–present) 
On November 26, 2020, Tate signed with the Houston Rockets of the National Basketball Association (NBA). Tate made his NBA debut on December 26, playing 37 minutes against the Portland Trail Blazers; he recorded 13 points, four rebounds, and two assists in the overtime loss. He started a team-high 58 games during the season and averaged 11.3 points, 5.3 rebounds, and 2.5 assists. Tate was selected to the NBA All-Rookie First Team at the end of the season, becoming only the second undrafted player to claim such honors.

On December 1, 2021, Tate scored an NBA career-high 32 points while also adding 10 rebounds, 7 assists, 5 blocks, and 2 steals in a win over the Oklahoma City Thunder, becoming only the second Houston Rockets player after Hakeem Olajuwon to achieve these totals in a single game.

On July 6, Tate re-signed with the Rockets on a three year, $22.1 million contract. On January 15, 2023, the NBA suspended Tate for one game without pay for leaving the bench area during an altercation between the Rockets and the Sacramento Kings two days earlier.

Career statistics

NBA

Regular season

|-
| style="text-align:left;"|
| style="text-align:left;"|Houston
| 70 || 58 || 29.2 || .506 || .308 || .694 || 5.3 || 2.5 || 1.2 || .5 || 11.3
|-
| style="text-align:left;"|
| style="text-align:left;"|Houston
| 78 || 77 || 26.4 || .498 || .312 || .707 || 5.4 || 2.8 || .9 || .5 || 11.8

Player profile 
During his rookie season with the Houston Rockets, Tate gained a reputation as a strong defender, with his play often compared to PJ Tucker. A predominately left-handed player with a strong drive, Tate finishes well at the rim, scoring 69% of his attempts as a rookie.

References

External links
 Ohio State Buckeyes bio

1995 births
Living people
American expatriate basketball people in Australia
American expatriate basketball people in Belgium
American men's basketball players
Antwerp Giants players
Basketball players from Ohio
Houston Rockets players
Ohio State Buckeyes men's basketball players
People from Pickerington, Ohio
Small forwards
Sydney Kings players
Undrafted National Basketball Association players